Oganez Armenakovich Mkhitaryan (born 26 August 1962) is a Russian professional football coach and a former player.

Playing career
He spent one season in the Soviet Top League with FC Fakel Voronezh.

External links
 

1962 births
Living people
Soviet footballers
Russian footballers
Russian people of Armenian descent
FC Fakel Voronezh players
Association football midfielders